Honoré I or Onorato I (16 December 1522 – 7 October 1581) was Lord of Monaco from 22 August 1523 to 7 October 1581.

Life
Honoré was the youngest child of Lucien Grimaldi (1487–1523) and Jeanne de Pontevès-Cabanes. He became Lord of Monaco at the age of 9 months, upon the assassination of his father on 22 August 1523. A regent was appointed for the young Lord in the form of his uncle, Augustine Grimaldi (1482–1532). 

Under Honoré’s father, Monaco had been a subject of France and its King, Francis I. Augustine Grimaldi severed this relationship, and in the signing of the Treaties of Burgos and Tordesillas (1524), swore Monaco’s allegiance to Spain, and its King, Holy Roman Emperor  Charles V. Monaco was therefore a protectorate of Spain, allowing the country to focus more on advancing and less on defending. The alliance with Spain would last until 1641, and weigh heavily on the financial situation of Monaco.

Augustine Grimaldi died on 14 April 1532, while Honoré was still a minor, and another regent was chosen for the young Lord.  His aunt Blanche Grimaldi, baronne de Tourette, became regent in co-regency with Nicholas Grimaldi.  Nicolas Grimaldi held the position of regent for only 9 days, and Blanche Grimaldi was likewise forced to leave Monaco in 1 July 1532.  
Étienne (Stephen) Grimaldi (died 1561), from Genoa and known as “the Governor”, was chosen as regent on 23 April 1532. 

Etienne remained regent until 16 December 1540, when Honoré reached his majority, and was responsible for restorations made to the Church of St. Nicholas. Etienne remained the de facto ruler of Monaco, with Honoré's blessing, until his death in 1561. 

The reign of Honoré I was relatively calm and peaceful, and Honoré was referred to as remarkable for his bravery, wisdom and valour.
During Honoré’s reign, extensive renovations and enlargements were made to the Palace of Monaco. Charles V paid a visit to Monaco in 1529, and Pope Paul III visited Monaco, on his way to the Council of Nice, during Honoré’s reign.

Marriage and children

In 1545 he married Isabella Grimaldi (died 1583). The couple had 4 sons;

Charles  (26 January 1555 – 17 May 1589)
François (1557–1586)
Horace  (1558–1559)
Hercules (24 September 1562 – 21 November 1604)

Ancestors

References

External links
The Hare Society Website
Monaco History

1522 births
1581 deaths
16th-century Lords of Monaco
House of Grimaldi
Lords of Monaco
Burials at the Cathedral of Our Lady Immaculate
People from Campagna
People of Ligurian descent